Narendra Budania (born 5 July 1956) is an Indian politician of the Indian National Congress from Churu district in Rajasthan, India. He was a Member of Parliament from Churu constituency in 1985, 1996 and 1998. He was a Rajya Sabha member in Rajasthan from 2012 to 2018.

Early life and education
Budaniya was born on 5 July 1956 in Dudhwa Khara village, District Churu, Rajasthan. He was born to Late Choudhary Pratap Singh Budaniya. He completed his early schooling from the government school in his village and later on moved to Churu for further education. He completed a BSc from Lohia P.G. College, Churu, & LL.B. from the University of Rajasthan, Jaipur. He was elected as the president of the Student Union at Lohia P.G. College, Churu in 1974 and 1975.

He married Kanak Budania in 1980. The couple has two sons.

Political career

Narendra Budaniya started showing interest in politics during his student life and was elected as the president of the student union at Lohia P.G. College, Churu in 1974 and 1975. In mainstream electoral politics, he started by being elected as a sarpanch of gram panchayat Dudhwakhara, Churu.

He joined the Congress party and has been a loyal congressman since then. While being a sarpanch, Budaniya emerged as a voice for farmers in the area and the Congress party gave him the responsibility of leading the Churu Zilla Kisan Congress from 1983 to 1985.

In 1985, the Congress party showed trust in his capability by giving him a ticket for the Lok Sabha elections from the Churu constituency. Budaniya won the election by a big margin and represented the congress party in the lower house of parliament for the 8th Lok Sabha from 1985 to 1989. During this period Budaniya served in many key positions and became a Mahamantri of the Indian Youth Congress in 1987. He also served as the President of the Rajasthan Kisan Congress from 1986 to 1987. Later on, he served as Sangthan Sachiv of the Rajasthan Pradesh Congress Committee.

In 1993, he was given the responsibility of fighting the Vidhansabha election from Sardarshahahr, Churu. He won the election by defeating Bhanwar lal Sharma by a big margin and served as a Member of the Legislative Assembly of Rajasthan from 1993 to 1996. During this period he served as an Up Mukhya Sachetak in Vidhanshabha.

Later on, he represented the Congress party again in the Lok Sabha two consecutive times. He was elected for the Eleventh and Twelfth Lok Sabha from the Churu constituency.

In 2009 he was elected as a Member of Rajya Sabha in a by-election. In 2010 he was again elected as a Member of Rajya Sabha in his second term and stayed for two years. In 2012, Budaniya was elected a member of Rajya Sabha for a full tenure and he served as a Rajya Sabha MP until 2018. During this period he also served as a Up Mukhya Schetak in Rajya Sabha.

In 2018, the party gave him a ticket to fight in the Vidhan Sabha election from Taranagar, Churu. Budaniya became a member of the Legislative Assembly of Rajasthan by comfortably winning the election.

Throughout his political career, he has been a loyal Congress party member and served the party for whatever he has been asked to do. He has emerged as a prominent voice for the farmer community and raised issues related to the betterment of farmers on various platforms including the state and national parliament.

Membership of the Lok Sabha

Membership of the Rajya Sabha

Membership of the Rajasthan Legislative Assembly

References

External links

Living people
1956 births
Rajasthani politicians
Rajasthani people
University of Rajasthan alumni
India MPs 1984–1989
India MPs 1996–1997
India MPs 1998–1999
Rajya Sabha members from Rajasthan
Lok Sabha members from Rajasthan
People from Churu district
Rajasthan MLAs 2018–2023